The Dark Web is a television documentary series produced by CNA.  It is a social documentary, distributed by Mediacorp Pte Ltd.  Individual episodes explore a diversity of crime genres, but all of which have been complicated with the involvement of technology. The series is based on real incidents like Operation Bayonet, Bulacan-based "sextortion" syndicate, and more.  

The Dark Web features experts from several fields including cybersecurity and criminology. Those in relevant industries were also invited to discuss the intersection of crime and technology.

Episodes 
The Dark Web is a series of four standalone episodes, all of which were released simultaneously on Channel News Asia on 10 July 2019. They can be watched in any order. The series is an instance of technology situating itself within criminology. Recurring themes throughout The Dark Web include data privacy and anonymity. Each episode explores varying genres of crime committed against the backdrop of the dark web. 

The Dark Web can be seen to demonstrate the double-edged sword that is social media usage. Every episode alludes to cyber crime being rife although the criminal mastermind gets apprehended.

Talent credit 
 Ericson Gangoso  - Director, Graphics & Executive Producer
 Kelly Lin - Producer, Series Producer & Executive Producer
 Diana Dwika Jayanti - Line Producer & Fixer
 Tan Yan Ling - Assistant Producer
 Darrel Moh - Assistant Producer
 Santirta Martendano - Camera
 Elliot Sng - Camera
 Grayson Seah - Camera Assistant
 Sary Latief - Legal Research
 Kenny Giam - Production Manager
 Jordon Katherine See - Post Producer
 Sueanne Teo - Editor
 Siti Rahayu Binte Mohd Ruslan - Translations
 Ngoi Soon Ling - Commissioning Editor (for CNA)
 Nadira Kasmani - Assistant Producer  (for CNA)
 Magda Lilia Chelly (Extra)

Awards and accolades 
In 2021, episode 4, “The Candyman”, of The Dark Web docuseries was awarded ‘Silver’ under the category of ‘Social Issues’ by New York Festivals TV & Film Awards.

References

External links 
 IMDb Page The Dark Web
 The Dark Web (2019)
 Dr Magda Chelly discusses The Dark Web with Channel News Asia
 The Dark Web on myCanal 
 Tatort Dark Web: Milliardengeschäft Schwarzmarkt 

Singaporean documentary television series
2010s documentary television series
Documentary television series about crime
2019 Singaporean television series debuts
2019 Singaporean television series endings
CNA (TV network) original programming